Li Sizhong (February 19, 1921 – January 11, 2009) was an ichthyologist with the Institute of Zoology at the Chinese Academy of Sciences. Throughout his research career, he made numerous discoveries of new fish species (or subspecies), and published many books and research papers describing the fauna and geographical distribution of fishes in China and beyond. He translated and helped publication of the Chinese editions of Fishes of the World (2nd edition, by Joseph S. Nelson) and Fish Migration (a popular science book by Russian zoologist Peter Schmidt). Li was the major author of two published volumes in the Fauna Sinica monograph series, systematically reviewing and describing orders of bony fishes that include flat fish, cod, silverside, pearlfish, killifish, flying fish, etc. in or near China. He had written over 40 popular science articles about fish on Chinese newspapers and magazines, and been responsible for compiling and editing fish-related entries in several standard reference books (including Encyclopedia of China and Zhonghua Dadian).  His works on freshwater ichthyofauna of China as well as other aspects of ichthyology are considered to be among some of the most notable in the Chinese ichthyology literature.

Career and research
Right after finishing graduate studies in ichthyology in 1950, Li initially worked on Chinese nomenclature of vertebrates, specializing in fishes, within the publication office of the newly-formed Chinese Academy of Sciences.  Later in the year, he joined a team of zoologists (including Tso-hsin Cheng) engaged in consolidating and sorting out zoological specimen inherited from Fan Memorial Institute of Biology and National Academy of Peiping, two predecessors of the Academy of Sciences, in preparation of the later formation of the Institute of Zoology. Within five years, a standard reference on Chinese nomenclature of vertebrates was published, with a select group of Chinese zoologists as co-authors and contributors. Among them, Li and his mentor Tchang Chun-Lin, along with Chu Yuan-Ting, were responsible for standardization of fish nomenclature in the Chinese language.  

Starting from the early 1950s, Li helped to initiate and participated in China's systematic surveys of marine fishes in Bohai Sea, Yellow Sea and South China Sea, along China's coast. His scientific career, however, was interrupted in 1957 when he was labelled a "rightist" during the Anti-Rightist Movement. From then until the mid-1970s, while his research and publication capacity had been severely impacted by whims of political campaigns and turmoils, he managed to conduct surveys of freshwater fishes in the Yellow River, Ou River and Ling River, as well as in endorheic regions such as Xinjiang 
and Gansu provinces in Western China.  While blacklisted as a "rightist" and assigned to work on aquaculture-related research in the early 1960s, he discovered a salmonid fish serendipitously in the vicinity of Qinling Mountains (considered to be a glacial refugium roughly in central part of China), which is later named Brachymystax tsinlingensis Li, 1966.  For a relatively tranquil period of about a year before the Cultural Revolution, he was allowed to publish research results related to the salmonid fish, fishes in the Yellow River, and earlier surveys of marine fishes.  But only until after rehabilitation in 1978, Li was able to resume normal research activities.

In his book Studies on zoogeographical divisions for fresh water fishes of China, Li divided the fauna of freshwater fishes in China into five major regions based on characteristics of fish species distributions, geographic environments and geological histories of these regions.  The five freshwater regions in China are: (1) Northern region containing upper reaches of rivers that flow into the Arctic Ocean, as well as Amur River and its tributaries; (2) Western China region; (3) Mongolian Plateau; (4) Eastern China region; and (5) Southern China region.   According to his method, the demarcation line between Holarctic and Indomalayan realms in China, as far as freshwater fishes are concerned, lies largely along the Himalayas and Nanling Mountains ranges, where the Southern China region is basically on the south side of the Nanling Mountains, a drainage divide between the Yangtze River and the Pearl River.  This idea is close to those of Wallace and Mori, and contrasts with the prevalent view of demarcation line  for terrestrial animals between Holarctic and Indomalaya regions along the Qinling Mountains (known as Qinling–Huaihe Line, though the Qinling Mountains does not extend into Eastern part of China).  Freshwater Ecoregions of the World (FEOW), a collaborative global biodiversity project partly sponsored by World Wide Fund for Nature (WWF), cites this book as a source of references in delineation of freshwater ecoregions of China.

Two of his books are published posthumously. In Fishes of the Yellow River and Beyond, he described over 170 native fish species and the characteristics of fish distribution in the Yellow River and its tributaries; a collection of his papers and popular science articles, as well as a personal memoir, are also included in the posthumous book published in Taiwan; this book was re-published in the mainland in 2017.  Comparing fish species in the Yellow River in 2010–2015 and the survey results originally reported by Li in 1965 as part of his research on the book, two recent Chinese studies conclude that only about half of the native fishes in the Yellow River could still be found, due to anthropogenic environmental alterations and  increased presence of introduced species over the past half-century.  Li was also the primary contributor to a volume of the Fauna Sinica series covering the orders of Atheriniformes, Cyprinodontiformes, Beloniformes, Ophidiiformes and Gadiformes, which was published posthumously in 2011.  Another volume of the Fauna Sinica series which he worked on during his last years, covering fish species in China within the orders of Beryciformes, Zeiformes, Lampriformes, Gasterosteiformes, Mugiliformes and Synbranchiformes (such as soldierfish, dory, opah, ribbonfish, stickleback, mullet, swamp eel, etc.), is yet to be  published.

Fish species discovered or named

Footnotes

1921 births
2009 deaths
Chinese ichthyologists
Biogeographers
Writers from Xinxiang
People's Republic of China science writers
Victims of the Cultural Revolution
Biologists from Henan
Beijing Normal University alumni
People of the Republic of China
People from Huixian
20th-century Chinese zoologists
English–Chinese_translators
Russian–Chinese_translators